Sir Charles Cox (1660–1729) was an English brewer and Whig Member of Parliament for Southwark from 1695 to 1712. For many years afterwards the MP for Southwark would generally be a brewer.

In 1709 he began to offer German Protestant refugees from the Palatinate ("Palatines") living space in his warehouses. Soon there were nearly fourteen hundred, and the residents of Southwark gave a petition to Parliament to have them removed.

Not long afterwards a fire in his warehouses lost him thousands of pounds. He was appointed High Sheriff of Surrey for 1717–18. He was ruined in the South Sea Bubble of 1720.

In 1734 the case of Lady Cox was heard and it was put on record that he had been a bigamist.

References

English brewers
1660 births
1729 deaths
People from Southwark
17th century in London
British MPs 1707–1708
British MPs 1708–1710
British MPs 1710–1713
Whig (British political party) MPs
English MPs 1695–1698
English MPs 1698–1700
English MPs 1701
English MPs 1701–1702
English MPs 1702–1705
English MPs 1705–1707
High Sheriffs of Surrey
Members of the Parliament of Great Britain for English constituencies
Freemasons of the Premier Grand Lodge of England